"Beat on My Drum" is a song by Italian DJ Gabry Ponte, released as a single on May 8, 2012. The song features vocals from Sophia Del Carmen and American rapper Pitbull.

Track listing
Digital download
"Beat on My Drum" (featuring Pitbull and Sophia Del Carmen) – 3:44

CD single
"Beat on My Drum" (Original US Radio Spanish) – 3:44
"Beat on My Drum" (Original US Radio English)" – 3:44

 Remixes - EP
 "Beat on My Drum" (Eu Radio Edit) - 3:47
 "Beat on My Drum" (Eu Extended Spanish) - 4:43 	
 "Beat on My Drum" (Gabry Ponte Club Mix Radio Spanish) - 3:02
 "Beat on My Drum" (Gabry Ponte Club Mix Extended Spanish) - 5:16
 "Beat on My Drum" (DJs from Mars Remix Radio) - 3:03
 "Beat on My Drum" (DJs from Mars Remix Extended) - 6:06

Credits and personnel
Lead vocals – Pitbull and Sophia Del Carmen
Producers –  Gabry Ponte
Lyrics – Armando Perez, Gabriele Ponte, Jose Perroni, Noel Fischer and Sofia Redondo
Label – Exit 8 Media Group, 	Dance & Love Recorder

Sources:

Charts

Release history

References

2011 songs
2012 singles
Gabry Ponte songs
Pitbull (rapper) songs
Songs written by Pitbull (rapper)